Dwarf eelgrass is a common name for several plants and may refer to:

Zostera japonica, native to the western Pacific Ocean and naturalized in the eastern Pacific
Zostera noltei, native to the eastern Atlantic Ocean